The 2020 Campeonato Brasileiro Série C was a football competition held in Brazil, equivalent to the third division. The competition was originally scheduled to begin on 3 May and end on 8 November, however due to COVID-19 pandemic the tournament was rescheduled for 8 August 2020 – 30 January 2021.

Twenty teams competed in the tournament, twelve returning from the 2019 season, four promoted from the 2019 Campeonato Brasileiro Série D (Brusque, Manaus, Ituano and Jacuipense) and four relegated from the 2019 Campeonato Brasileiro Série B (Londrina, São Bento, Criciúma and Vila Nova).

The matches Treze v Imperatriz, scheduled for 9 August 2020 (Group A 1st round), and Imperatriz v Jacuipense, scheduled for 15 August 2020 (Group A 2nd round), were postponed after 14 Imperatriz players tested positive for COVID-19.

Brusque, Londrina, Remo and Vila Nova were promoted to the 2021 Campeonato Brasileiro Série B.

Vila Nova defeated Remo 8–3 on aggregate in the finals to win their third title.

Format changes
Starting from this edition, the quarter-finals and semi-finals were replaced by a second group stage played by eight teams. They were divided into two groups of four teams each. The top two teams of each group were promoted to the Série B, while the group winners qualified for the finals.

Teams

Number of teams by state

Personnel

First stage
In the first stage, each group was played on a home-and-away round-robin basis. The teams were ranked according to points (3 points for a win, 1 point for a draw, and 0 points for a loss). If tied on points, the following criteria would be used to determine the ranking: 1. Wins; 2. Goal difference; 3. Goals scored; 4. Head-to-head (if the tie is only between two teams); 5. Fewest red cards; 6. Fewest yellow cards; 7. Draw in the headquarters of the Brazilian Football Confederation (Regulations Article 15).

The top four teams of each group advanced to the second stage.

Group A

Results

Group B

Results

Second stage
In the second stage, each group was played on a home-and-away round-robin basis. The teams were ranked according to points (3 points for a win, 1 point for a draw, and 0 points for a loss). If tied on points, the criteria to determine the ranking were the same as used in the first stage (Regulations Article 19).

The top two teams of each group were promoted to the Série B. Group winners advanced to the finals.

Group C

Results

Group D

Results

Finals
The finals were played on a home-and-away two-legged basis, with the higher-seeded team hosting the second leg. If tied on aggregate, the away goals rule would not be used, extra time would not be played, and the penalty shoot-out would be used to determine the champions (Regulations Article 20).

The finalists were seeded according to their performance in the tournament. The teams were ranked according to overall points. If tied on overall points, the following criteria would be used to determine the ranking: 1. Overall wins; 2. Overall goal difference; 3. Draw in the headquarters of the Brazilian Football Confederation (Regulations Article 21).

The matches were played on 23 and 30 January 2021.

|}

Matches

Top goalscorers

References

Campeonato Brasileiro Série C seasons
3
Campeonato Brasileiro Série C